Frigidaire Appliance Company is the American consumer and commercial home appliances brand subsidiary of multinational company Electrolux.

Frigidaire was founded as the Guardian Frigerator Company in Fort Wayne, Indiana, and developed the first self-contained refrigerator, invented by Nathaniel B. Wales and  Alfred Mellowes in 1916. In 1918, William C. Durant, a founder of General Motors, personally invested in the company and in 1919, it adopted the name Frigidaire.

The brand was so well known in the refrigeration field in the early-to-mid-1900s, that many Americans called any refrigerator a Frigidaire regardless of brand. In France, Canada, and some other French-speaking countries or areas, the word Frigidaire is often in use as a synonym today, and in transcribed form in Serbocroatian also ("frižider", "фрижидер"). Although the alliterative names Frigidaire or its antecedent Frigerator suggest an origin of the widely used English word fridge, it is simply a contraction of refrigerator, a word in use since 1611.

From 1919 to 1979, the company was owned by General Motors. During that period, it was first a subsidiary of Delco-Light and was later an independent division based in Dayton, Ohio. The division also manufactured air conditioning compressors for GM cars. While the company was owned by General Motors, its logo featured the phrase "Product of General Motors", and later renamed to "Home Environment Division of General Motors".

Frigidaire was sold to the White Consolidated Industries in 1979, which in 1986 was purchased by Electrolux, its current parent.

The company claims firsts including:
 Electric self-contained refrigerator (September, 1918 in Detroit)
 Home food freezer
 Room air conditioner
 30" electric range
 Coordinated colors for home appliances

Automatic washers

During the years that Frigidaire was owned by General Motors, it was very competitive in the automatic clothes-washing-machine business. Frigidaire engineer Kenneth Sisson, also credited with the design of the incrementing timer used on clothes washers and dishwashers for years to come, designed the Frigidaire automatic washer with the Unimatic mechanism in the late 1930s.  Production of the first Frigidaire automatic clothes washers was halted due to World War II and therefore the machine was not formally introduced until 1947.  The washing action of a Frigidaire automatic was unique in that the agitator pulsated up and down, a unique departure from the traditional oscillating type.  The Frigidaire washers were commonly named for their mechanisms, which underwent frequent changes over the years.  The Unimatic was in production the longest, for any single Frigidaire mechanism, from 1947 to 1958 for home automatic washers and through 1963 for coin-operated commercial washers for self-service laundromats.  The Pulsamatic mechanism, unique in that it pulsated 630 times per minute, was introduced in 1955 for the lower-end models.  This became the foundation for the Multimatic, introduced for the 1959 model year.  The Multimatic lasted through 1964, as the Rollermatic was brought out for the 1965 lineup.  The Rollermatic was unique in that instead of using an oil-filled gearcase, metal and urethane rollers transferred the power within the mechanism.  This underwent a slight revision in 1970 for the new eighteen-pound capacity 1-18, which kept the same basic mechanism but differed in that it was belt-driven off of the motor and added a recirculating pump.  Besides the unique action, another notable feature of these older washers was the final, high-speed spin cycle (nicknamed "Rapidry"), 1140 revolutions per minute in the Unimatic, 850 in the Multimatic, and 1010 in the high-end Rollermatic models.

When Frigidaire was acquired by White Consolidated Industries in 1979, it abandoned the General Motors design in favor of the Westinghouse-produced top-loading design, as White-Westinghouse was already among its house brands by this time.

Refrigerators

Frigidaire also produces a wide variety of refrigerators and freezers for the consumer market.  Their model line-up includes refrigerator freezer units of several different types.  The selection they offer includes traditional Top Freezer models, as well as more modern Side-By-Side and French Door styles.

In 2016, Frigidaire partnered with Ryder and Embark, an autonomous trucking firm, to deliver refrigerators from Texas to California. Level 2 autonomous trucks are used. They have a driver behind the wheel at all times. The reason for experimenting with autonomous vehicles is a looming shortage of drivers. In 2015, the American Trucking Association predicted that there would be a shortage of 175,000 drivers by 2024.

Air conditioners

In addition to manufacturing room air conditioners, Frigidaire also provided the factory air conditioning systems for General Motors (GM) automobiles.  From the 1950s through the 1970s, these units developed a reputation for providing powerful air conditioning systems on virtually all GM cars and trucks from the largest Cadillacs to the small Chevrolet Vega. GM also sold Frigidaire auto air conditioning compressors to British Leyland for Jaguar and to Rolls-Royce for Rolls-Royce and Bentley branded cars.

Manufacturing
A new cooktop manufacturing facility opened in the Frank C. Pidgeon Industrial park, southwest of Memphis. The facility is built to LEED certification standards. Workers will manufacture the company's Electrolux ICON, Electrolux and Frigidaire product lines, including drop-in/slide-in ranges, wall ovens, specialty free standing ranges and cook tops. The $190 million, 750,000 square foot Memphis manufacturing plant began production of stoves and ranges in 2013. The plant's research and development center includes the technology and machinery to simulate a stove's lifetime usage and performance expectations and can test more than 300 products at one time.

Electrolux/Frigidaire also operates a manufacturing facility for free standing gas and electric ranges in Springfield, Tennessee. The Springfield facility currently employs about 2,900 people.

It also has operated a large manufacturing facility in Northern Mexico since 2005.

As of 2022, air conditioning units are manufactured in China.

See also
Frigidaire Building, a historic structure in Portland, Oregon

References

External links
 

Home appliance manufacturers of the United States
Electronics companies established in 1919
Home appliance brands
Manufacturing companies based in Georgia (U.S. state)
General Motors marques
Electrolux brands
1986 mergers and acquisitions
Refrigerators